Illadelph Halflife is the third studio album by American hip hop band the Roots, released September 24, 1996 on DGC and Geffen Records. It features a tougher and broader sound than their previous album, Do You Want More?!!!??! (1995). The album also contains integration of programmed drums and guest contributions by R&B musicians such as Amel Larrieux and D'Angelo, as well as jazz musicians such as David Murray, Steve Coleman, Cassandra Wilson, Graham Haynes. In 1998, the album was selected as one of The Sources 100 Best Rap Albums. In 2006, the album was selected as one of Hip Hop Connections 100 Best Rap Albums from 1995 to 2005. The master tapes for the album were destroyed in a fire at the Universal Studios back lot in 2008.

Reception

The New York Times writer Neil Strauss called the album "one of the year's best rap offerings" and wrote that "The Roots move indiscriminately from politically conscious lyrics (not just about black America but also about Bosnia, the Olympics and terrorism) to silly rhymes ('roam like a cellular phone/far from home')". The Philadelphia Inquirer wrote that "while it doesn't sacrifice a smidgen of street-level intensity, it reaffirms just how far-reaching (and how far removed from the gangsta stereotype) hip-hop can be". Tracii McGregor of The Source magazine called it "a thoughtful musical endeavor ... an emotional and spiritually fulfilling aural experience". Spin critic Selwyn Seyfu Hinds described it as "an artistic progression, and added confirmation of the Roots' place at hip-hop's vanguard". The San Diego Union-Tribunes Jeff Niesel stated "the Roots find the perfect mixture of jazz and hip-hop for their songs about the hardships of urban life".

Then it won't." However, Illadelph Halflife was ranked number 33 on The Village Voices Pazz & Jop critics' poll of 1996. A 2004 retrospective review by Rolling Stone perceived it as an improvement over the Roots's previous work, stating "The messages grew more focused on 1996's Illadelph Halflife, which includes several strident anti-gangsta tirades and taunts. Black Thought replaced the bellicose, confrontational bravado of so many rappers with discussions of fidelity and responsibility".

Track listing
Continuation from Do You Want More???

The track listing on some album releases denotes the first track as track #34, combining the track totals from Organix (17 tracks) and Do You Want More?!!!??! (16 tracks), making 33 total tracks. The rest of the tracks continue upward from 34 to the Outro (being track #53)

Usage of songs

The intro of the song named "Section" is sampled by Jeremy Harding for his "Playground riddim", which was later used as the instrumental for Beenie Man's 1997 single "Who Am I (Sim Simma)".

Charts

Credits 
 Producer(s): The Grand Negaz, Questlove, Black Thought, Kelo, Q-Tip (The Ummah), Raphael Saadiq, Scratch, Chaos, L.A. Jay, Slimkid3, Scott Storch
 Executive Producer: Richard Nichols
 Mixing Engineer(s): Bob Power, Duro, Questlove, Black Thought, Richard Nichols, Kelo, Tim Donovan, Mel Lewis
 Photography: Michael Lavine
 Layout Design: Julius Niskey

References

Notes

External links 
 Illadelph Halflife at Discogs
 Album Review at RapReviews
 Deeper Roots: The Funky Four from Illadelphia Get Electric — By Vibe
 Critic's Pick: A Different Drum — By New York

1996 albums
Albums produced by Q-Tip (musician)
Albums produced by Questlove
Albums produced by Raphael Saadiq
Albums produced by Scott Storch
DGC Records albums
The Roots albums